Bretea Română is a commune in Hunedoara County, Transylvania, Romania. It is composed of thirteen villages: Bățălar (Bacalár), Bercu (Berkány), Bretea Română, Bretea Streiului (Magyarbrettye), Covragiu (Kovrágy), Gânțaga (Goncága), Măceu (Mácsó), Ocolișu Mare (Nagyoklos), Plopi (Sztrigyplop), Ruși (Russ), Vâlcele (Pokolvalcsel), Vâlcelele Bune (Jóvalcsel) and Vâlceluța.

Natives
 Mircea Păcurariu

References

Communes in Hunedoara County
Localities in Transylvania